Martin Toft Madsen (born 20 February 1985 in Birkerød) is a Danish cyclist, who currently rides for UCI Continental team .

Major results

2015
 3rd Duo Normand (with Mathias Westergaard)
2016
 1st  Time trial, National Road Championships
 2nd Duo Normand (with Lars Carstensen)
 3rd Chrono des Nations
 8th Sundvolden GP
2017
 1st  Time trial, National Road Championships
 1st Chrono des Nations
 1st Skive–Løbet
 6th Time trial, UEC European Road Championships
 7th Sundvolden GP
 9th Duo Normand (with Morten Hulgaard)
2018
 1st  Time trial, National Road Championships
 1st Duo Normand (with Rasmus Quaade)
 1st Chrono des Nations
 1st Chrono Champenois
 1st Hafjell GP
 9th Sundvolden GP
 10th Time trial, UCI Road World Championships
2019
 1st Stage 2 (ITT) Danmark Rundt
 2nd Time trial, National Road Championships
 3rd Chrono Champenois
 7th Chrono des Nations
 9th Time trial, UEC European Road Championships
2020
 2nd Time trial, National Road Championships
2021
 2nd Time trial, National Road Championships
 2nd Chrono des Nations
2022
 4th Chrono des Nations

References

External links

1985 births
Living people
Danish male cyclists
People from Rudersdal Municipality
Sportspeople from the Capital Region of Denmark